John F. Burnett is an American film editor.

Filmography
The Heart Is a Lonely Hunter (1968)
Suppose They Gave a War and Nobody Came (1970)
The Owl and the Pussycat (1970)
Wild Rovers (1972)
The Culpepper Cattle Co. (1972)
The Way We Were (1973)
The Sunshine Boys (1975)
Murder By Death (1976)
The Domino Principle (1977)
Grease (1978)
...And Justice for All (1979)
Can't Stop the Music (1980)
Death Hunt (1982)
Grease 2 (1982)
The Winds of War (1983)
Irreconcilable Differences (1984)
Class Act (1992)
Leap of Faith (1992)

References

External links

Living people
American film editors
Year of birth missing (living people)
Primetime Emmy Award winners